Shahrak-e Shoeyb Nabi (also Romanized as Shahrak-e Sho‘eyb Nabī) is a village in Shoaybiyeh-ye Gharbi Rural District, Shadravan District, Shushtar County, Khuzestan Province, Iran. At the 2006 census, its population was 499, in 80 families.

References 

Populated places in Shushtar County